Andreas Sonny "Andy" Robinson (born 16 October 1992) is an English semi-professional footballer who primarily plays as a central midfielder most recently for Weymouth.

Early life
Robinson was born in Bournemouth.

Club career

Southampton
Described as "a strong presence in the heart of midfield", Andy Robinson joined the Southampton Academy at the age of eight, and has previously captained the club's under-18 side. The midfielder was promoted to the Southampton first team at the beginning of the 2012–13 season, and made his debut for the team on 25 September 2012 in a 2−0 win over Sheffield Wednesday in the third round of the League Cup, coming on as an 81st-minute substitute for Jack Cork.

Bolton Wanderers
On 27 March 2014, Robinson joined Football League Championship club Bolton Wanderers on loan until the end of the season. During his loan spell he spent no time on the pitch, making 6 appearances on the substitutes bench. Despite this, on 21 May it was confirmed that Robinson would join Bolton on a one-year contract from July 2014. However, on 19 July the club confirmed the player had left as he had failed to settle in the area.

Dorchester Town
On 9 October 2014, Robinson signed non contract terms with Southern Football League club Dorchester Town.

Weymouth
On 28 June 2019, Robinson joined Weymouth.

Career statistics

References

External links
Southampton under-21s

Andy Robinson at Aylesbury United

1992 births
Living people
Footballers from Bournemouth
English footballers
Association football midfielders
Southampton F.C. players
Bolton Wanderers F.C. players
Dorchester Town F.C. players
Gosport Borough F.C. players
Havant & Waterlooville F.C. players
Weymouth F.C. players
National League (English football) players
Isthmian League players
Southern Football League players